The Dik Van Dykes were a garage punk sextet based in Hamilton, Ontario, Canada who first formed in 1985 and folded in 1989.

They released two albums, Nobody Likes...The Dik Van Dykes (1987), and Waste Mor Vinyl (1989), on the Og Records label, preceded by a limited edition indie cassette, Live At the Gown and Gavel... and countless compilation records such as the It Came from Canada series issued by OG Records (the Deja Voodoo guys).

Most of the Dik Van Dykes' songs were humorous in nature, often satirizing local and Canadian culture. "Curling", "Birthday Song" and "Adult Gumby" were fan favorites. The band received significant airplay on McMaster University's CFMU-FM 93.3, Memorial University of Newfoundland's (MUN) CHMR 93.5, and many other student-run radio stations.

They opened for the Ramones on three nights in 1988, and played with other great bands of the era such as Shadowy Men on a Shadowy Planet, UIC, Wetspots, Heimlich Maneuver and Deja Voodoo.

In the 90s, Sarah Hodgson asked Mike (Dik) Johnson to join her band, Sinister Dude Ranch. He accepted, but with one condition, that the band change its name to "I Love My Shih Tzu". The band's first song was actually a Dik Van Dykes song, "Too Much Like Fun". The band broke up in the early 21st century.

Notes

External links
  Dik Van Dykes Myspace page
 Punk History Canada

Canadian punk rock groups
Musical groups from Hamilton, Ontario
Musical groups established in 1985
Musical groups disestablished in 1989
1985 establishments in Ontario
1989 disestablishments in Ontario
Canadian garage rock groups